Sepat may refer to:
 the Ancient Egyptian name for the regional divisions of the country. The Greek term nomos has been used in its place since the Ptolemaic period
 Typhoon Sepat (disambiguation), the name of various weather disturbances in the north Pacific Ocean
 Tanjung Sepat, Pahang, a town in Pahang in Malaysia
 Tanjung Sepat, Selangor, a town in Selangor, Malaysia